Nikhom Phatthana is a subdistrict in the Bang Rakam District of Phitsanulok Province, Thailand.

Geography
Nikhom Phatthana lies in the Yom Basin, which is part of the Chao Phraya Watershed.

Administration
The following is a list of the subdistrict's muban (villages):

References

Tambon of Phitsanulok province
Populated places in Phitsanulok province